Ekaterina Pitirimova (born 5 July 1996) is a Russian rower. She competed in the 2020 Summer Olympics.

Her father, Viktor, was also a rower, representing the Soviet Union at the 1992 Summer Olympics.

References

1996 births
Living people
People from Kolomna
Rowers at the 2020 Summer Olympics
Russian female rowers
Olympic rowers of Russia
Sportspeople from Moscow Oblast